Gorazi may refer to:
 Gorazi, Fars
 Gorazi, Kerman
 Gorazi, Bakharz, Razavi Khorasan Province
 Gorazi, Khvaf, Razavi Khorasan Province